The 2020 Zinsser SmartCoat 200 was the 14th stock car race of the 2020 ARCA Menards Series, the eighth race of the 2020 Sioux Chief Showdown, and the inaugural iteration of the event. The race was held on Saturday, September 5, 2020, in Lebanon, Missouri, at Lebanon I-44 Speedway, a  permanent oval-shaped racetrack. The race took the scheduled 200 laps to complete. At race's end, Sam Mayer of GMS Racing would take over the lead from a dominating Hailie Deegan near the end of the race to win his third career ARCA Menards Series win and his third of the season. To fill out the podium, Bret Holmes of Bret Holmes Racing and Taylor Gray of DGR-Crosley would finish second and third, respectively.

Background 
Lebanon I-44 Speedway is a multi-purpose speedway located in Ozark hills just off Interstate 44 outside Lebanon, Missouri. The Speedway's main 3/8 mile oval has been holding races since 1982.

Entry list

Practice 
The only practice session was held on Saturday, September 5.

Qualifying 
Qualifying was held on Saturday, September 5, at 6:00 PM EST. Each driver would have two laps to set a fastest time; the fastest of the two would count as their official qualifying lap. 

It was Holmes' first ever career pole in the series.

Full qualifying results

Race results

References 

2020 ARCA Menards Series
September 2020 sports events in the United States
2020 in sports in Missouri